The discography of Heavy D consists of eight studio albums, two compilation albums and 14 singles.

Studio albums

Compilations

Singles

As featured artist

References

Hip hop discographies
Discographies of American artists